Chad Klinger is a Canadian country music artist. Klinger recorded his self-titled debut CD in Nashville in 1998, produced by Dean Sams of Lonestar. Two singles released from the project, "Who Needs the Moon" and "Bring It On," reached the Top 30 of the RPM Country Tracks chart. He took a break from his recording career in 2000 to enroll in the University of Alberta.

Klinger returned to the music business in November 2009 with the single "Minivan Man," which has reached the Top 50 of the Billboard Canadian Country Singles chart. His second album, The Man I Am Inside, was released in April 2010.

Discography

Albums

Singles

References

External links

Canadian country singer-songwriters
Canadian male singer-songwriters
Living people
Year of birth missing (living people)
University of Alberta alumni
Musicians from Saskatchewan